George Edward Sangmeister (February 16, 1931 – October 7, 2007) was an American politician and United States Representative from Illinois. He originally represented Illinois' 4th congressional district, before it was renumbered as the 11th district.

Early life
Sangmeister was born in Frankfort, Illinois. Sangmeister married Doris Hinspeter. He attended Joliet Junior College before entering the military and serving as a sergeant in the United States Army during the Korean War. After returning to private life, he attended Elmhurst College and then earned a law degree from the John Marshall Law School in Chicago. Sangmeister spent several years in private law practice before becoming a magistrate for Will County, Illinois in 1961. In 1964, he became the county's district attorney.

Illinois state politics
In 1972, Sangmeister was elected as a Democrat to the Illinois House of Representatives. In the 1976 general election, Sangmeister defeated Republican incumbent James F. Bell to be elected to a four-year term serving as the 42nd district's state senator in the Illinois Senate. Sangmeister became a powerful Democratic leader in the state Senate.

In the 1986 Illinois gubernatorial election, Sangmeister ran for the Democratic nomination for lieutenant governor and was endorsed by presumptive Democratic nominee Adlai Stevenson III to be his running mate. However, Sangmeister lost to Mark Fairchild, a LaRouchite entryist, in the Democratic primary. Sangmeister opted against joining Stevenson on the newly formed Solidarity Party. Stevenson chose former Cook County judge and son of Michael Howlett Michael J. Howlett Jr. to serve as his new running mate. The incumbent Republicans James R. Thompson and George Ryan defeated Stevenson and Howlett in the general election.

Congress
In 1988, Sangmeister was elected to Congress in a marginally Republican district. After three terms in the House, he declined to seek re-election in 1994, citing his frustration with national politics. Jerry Weller, a Republican state legislator, defeated fellow state legislator and Democratic candidate Frank Giglio in the 1994 general election to succeed Sangmeister.

Later life and death
He returned to private law practice for several years thereafter. He died of leukemia, aged 76. He was interred on October 11, 2007, at Abraham Lincoln National Cemetery in Elwood, Illinois.

References

External links

 

1931 births
2007 deaths
American people of German descent
Joliet Junior College alumni
Military personnel from Illinois
United States Army soldiers
United States Army personnel of the Korean War
Elmhurst College alumni
John Marshall Law School (Chicago) alumni
Democratic Party Illinois state senators
Deaths from leukemia
Deaths from cancer in Illinois
Democratic Party members of the Illinois House of Representatives
Democratic Party members of the United States House of Representatives from Illinois
20th-century American politicians
Burials at Abraham Lincoln National Cemetery